A kneeboard is a board ridden in a kneeling stance. Kneeboards are ridden in ocean surf, or while being towed behind a boat on a lake or river.

Background
Kneeboard riders generally wear life jackets or wet suits and catch the wave by paddling and kicking or dipping their hand in the water .  Advantages to kneeboarding include an extremely low center of gravity, less wind resistance, the ability to ride higher and farther back in the tubes, and taking off on a steeper part of the wave. 

Towed kneeboarding is an offshoot of kneeboard surfing; kneeboard riders compete tricks, and expression session events. Towed kneeboards have a padded deck contoured to the shape of the shins and knees and a strap holds the rider to the board. Towed kneeboarding declined in popularity with the advent of wakeboarding and other modern watersports; however, it still enjoys popularity among water skiers and newer models of the kneeboard are still in production. A kneeboard is a good piece of equipment to start out on for boat-towed sports—the low center of gravity often makes it easier to get up on than a waterski or wakeboard, which both require standing up.

Surf kneeboard innovators include George Greenough, Steve Lis, Peter Crawford and Ron Romanosky. Till Wipperfuerth is one of the actual top performers in kneeboarding, since he became champion of the Tunilake Kneeboard Masters.

Kneeboarding is also a very easy alternative weight boarding

See also
 Surfing
 Barefoot skiing
 Sit-down hydrofoil

References

External links
 
 

Towed water sports
Surfing equipment
Kneeling